"I'll Be There" is the first single released on Third Album by The Jackson 5. It was written by Berry Gordy, Hal Davis, Bob West, and Willie Hutch.

The song was recorded by The Jackson 5 and released by Motown Records on August 28, 1970, as the first single from their Third Album on the same date. Produced by the songwriters, "I'll Be There" was The Jackson 5's fourth number-one hit in a row (after "I Want You Back" in 1969, "ABC" and "The Love You Save" earlier in 1970), making them the first group to have their first four singles reach number one and the first black male group with four consecutive number-one pop hits. "I'll Be There" is also notable as the most successful single released by Motown during its "Detroit era" (1959–72).  In 2011, the song was inducted into the Grammy Hall of Fame.

The cover version/duet by Mariah Carey and Trey Lorenz was recorded during Carey's appearance on MTV Unplugged in 1992, and released as the first single from her EP MTV Unplugged in the second quarter of 1992. Co-produced by Carey and Walter Afanasieff, "I'll Be There" became Carey's sixth number-one single in the US, and her biggest hit elsewhere at the time.

The Jackson 5 version

Release and reaction
In his autobiography Moon Walk, Michael Jackson noted that "I'll Be There" was the song that solidified The Jackson 5's careers and showed audiences that the group had potential beyond bubblegum pop. Said Allmusic about the song, "Rarely, if ever, had one so young sung with so much authority and grace, investing this achingly tender ballad with wisdom and understanding far beyond his years". Jackson turned 12 one day after the song was released.

The most successful single ever released by the Jackson 5, "I'll Be There" sold 4.2 million copies in the United States, and 6.1 million copies worldwide. It replaced Marvin Gaye's "I Heard It Through the Grapevine" as the most successful single released on Motown in the US, a record it held until the release of Lionel Richie's duet with Diana Ross, "Endless Love" (1981). Outside the US, "I Heard It Through the Grapevine" remained Motown's biggest-selling record with worldwide sales of over seven million copies.

The song held the number-one position on the Billboard Pop Singles Chart for five weeks from October 17 to November 14, replacing "Cracklin' Rosie" by Neil Diamond; it was succeeded by "I Think I Love You" by The Partridge Family. "I'll Be There" was also a number-one hit on the Billboard Best Selling Soul Singles Chart for six weeks, and a number 4 hit in the United Kingdom. The single's B-side was "One More Chance", a song from their second album.

"I'll Be There" was the Jackson 5's final number-one Hot 100 hit as a group. For the rest of their career as a major-label act, Jackson 5 singles would climb no higher than number 2. Michael Jackson scored numerous number-one hits as a solo artist, beginning with "Ben" in 1972.

The song was remixed by Wayne Wilkins for the 2009 release The Remix Suite.

Live performances
"I'll Be There" remains one of the most popular of the Jackson 5's hits, and has been covered by a number of artists, including Josie and the Pussycats and Mariah Carey, whose cover brought the song back into the public's consciousness two decades after its original release.

"I'll Be There" was one of the songs used in the showcase for Grease: You're the One that I Want!.

Andy Williams released a version in 1971 on his album, You've Got a Friend.

Willie Hutch, who was an original co-writer on the song, recorded a version for his 1973 album Fully Exposed.

Green Day has frequently performed a live medley beginning with their original song "King For A Day", morphing into The Isley Brothers' "Shout" and breaks into a smaller medley including The Penguins' "Earth Angel", "I'll Be There", and Ben E. King's "Stand by Me", then back into "Shout".

Australian pop group The Chantoozies recorded a version in 1989, during the sessions for their second album Gild the Lily. It did not appear on the album, but was released as a single in 1991.

The song was performed in the "Jackson 5 medley" during all of Michael's tours: The Bad, Dangerous and HIStory tours.

The song was performed by Michael Jackson in the 2009 film Michael Jackson's This Is It. However, the song was performed by Jackson and backup singers as if they were the Jackson 5. During the song, clips of the Jackson 5 are shown. At the end of the song, Michael dedicates the song to all of his brothers and his parents.

"I'll Be There" was used for a Pepsi commercial during the Dangerous World Tour in 1992. The commercial featured Michael playing the song on his home piano, remembering the Jackson 5 days until his younger self arrives to sing the song with him. Kids Incorporated covered "I'll Be There" in 1992 in the season 8 episode "Lay Off".

In 2000, the song was recorded by Irish boy band Westlife on the Deluxe Edition of their album Coast to Coast.

Personnel
Michael Jackson and Jermaine Jackson – lead and background vocals
Tito Jackson – background vocals
Marlon Jackson – background vocals
Jackie Jackson – background vocals, tambourine 
Los Angeles area studio musicians – instrumentation
David T. Walker – guitar
Louis Shelton – guitar
Arthur Wright – guitar
Bob West – bass guitar
Gene Pello – drums
Joe Sample – keyboards
Produced by Hal Davis
Arranged by Bob West

Charts

Weekly singles charts

Year-end charts

All-time charts

Certifications

Mariah Carey version

American singer and songwriter Mariah Carey had included "I'll Be There" as a last-minute addition to her MTV Unplugged setlist, after she had been informed that most acts on the show commonly perform at least one cover. "I'll Be There" was the sixth track on Carey's MTV Unplugged special, taped on March 16, 1992. It was performed as a romantic duet, with Carey singing Michael Jackson's lines and R&B singer Trey Lorenz singing Jermaine Jackson's lines. The program and resulting MTV Unplugged album were produced by Carey and Walter Afanasieff, who played the piano for the performance. Boyz II Men's Wanya Morris sang the song with Carey in the concert home video, Fantasy: Mariah Carey at Madison Square Garden. The song is composed in common time and has a moderate tempo of 84 beats per minute. Carey's vocal range spans two octaves and three semitones from the low note of D3 to the high note of F5.

The MTV Unplugged special aired on May 20, 1992, and was a notable success. Carey's label, Columbia Records, received many requests to release "I'll Be There" as a single, which had not been planned. A radio edit of the song was created which removed dialogue portions of the performance, and "I'll Be There" was released as a single. In the US, the song was issued with "So Blessed" as a B-side; in the United Kingdom, the "I'll Be There" single included the live version of "Vision of Love", and the album versions of "If It's Over" and "All in Your Mind".

"I'll Be There" was nominated for the 1993 Grammy Award for Best R&B Performance by a Duo or Group with Vocals and Best R&B Song, losing both categories to Boyz II Men's "End of the Road". The "I'll Be There" music video, directed by Larry Jordan, was compiled from footage of Carey's MTV Unplugged appearance.

During Michael Jackson's memorial service on July 7, 2009, Carey and Lorenz sang their rendition of the song in tribute to Jackson 17 years after their first performance together.

Regularly, "I'll Be There" has been featured on Carey's catalog albums included on #1's (1998), Greatest Hits (2001), The Ballads (2008), The Essential Mariah Carey (2011), and #1 to Infinity (2015).

Critical reception

AllMusic editor Shawn M. Haney highlighted it and wrote, "...the power and esteem of these tales lift to new heights and remain at a peak with the breathtaking, moment-making performance of "I'll Be There"." Larry Flick from Billboard stated that Carey "delivers an astonishingly restrained and soulful rendition". He added, "She is complemented by rich vocal support from Epic newcomer Trey Lorenz." An editor from Entertainment Weekly wrote that Mariah turned this song into a "killer duet." In 2018, the magazine called it a "revelation", noting that she "made it utterly her own."

Track listing
 Worldwide CD single
 "I'll Be There"
 "So Blessed"

 European CD maxi-single
 "I'll Be There"
 "So Blessed"
 "Vanishing"

 UK CD maxi-single
 "I'll Be There"
 "Vision of Love" 
 "If It's Over"
 "All in Your Mind"

Chart performance
After the underperformance of "Make It Happen" compared to her previous singles, "I'll Be There" was a return to form for Carey: it became her sixth number-one on the US Billboard Hot 100 and allayed any concerns her record label had about her career in decline. "I'll Be There" was the number-one song on the Hot 100 for two weeks, from June 13, 1992, to June 27. It replaced "Jump" by Kris Kross, and was itself replaced by "Baby Got Back" by Sir Mix-a-Lot. It became number-one on the US Hot Adult Contemporary Tracks. In fact, it is the only single released from the MTV Unplugged series that hit number-one.

"I'll Be There" was Carey's breakthrough hit outside North America, becoming her most successful single in numerous markets. It topped the Canadian Singles Chart for two weeks, and became her first number-one single in the Netherlands for three weeks, and her second in New Zealand for five weeks. It also became her biggest hit at the time in the United Kingdom (where it hit number 2) and Australia (where it reached number 9). It peaked inside the top 20 in most markets across Europe, where Carey's success had previously been limited.

The song has sold a total of 345,000 copies in the UK.

Charts

Weekly charts

Year-end charts

Decade-end charts

Certifications and sales

Arthur Hanlon version

In 2013, American pianist Arthur Hanlon covered the song in bachata with Dominican guest singer Karlos Rosé as the lead vocalist. Their cover was recorded in Spanglish and will be included on Hanlon's Encanto del Caribe tour. The song was produced by Hanlon and David Cabera.

Charts

See also
 Hot 100 number-one hits of 1970 (United States)
 List of Billboard Hot 100 number-one singles of 1992
 List of number-one adult contemporary singles of 1992 (U.S.)

References

1970 singles
1970s ballads
1992 singles
2013 singles
Songs written by Berry Gordy
Songs written by Hal Davis
The Jackson 5 songs
Mariah Carey songs
Trey Lorenz songs
Andy Williams songs
Song recordings produced by Walter Afanasieff
Billboard Hot 100 number-one singles
Cashbox number-one singles
Number-one singles in New Zealand
RPM Top Singles number-one singles
Motown singles
Columbia Records singles
Pop ballads
Rhythm and blues ballads
Male–female vocal duets
Live singles
Song recordings produced by Hal Davis
1970 songs
Sony Music singles
Universal Music Latin Entertainment singles
Songs written by Willie Hutch
Soul ballads